Sydney Ashlyn Johnson-Scharpf (born August 2, 2000 in Orlando, Florida) is an American artistic gymnast and daughter of Brandy Johnson, a member of the 1988 USA Olympic Team.

Competitive history

2013 
Johnson-Scharpf competed at the 2013 Nastia Liukin Cup and placed 23rd. She later qualified to Elite and competed at the Secret U.S. Classic, finishing 18th. At U.S. Nationals, Sydney placed 27th.

2014 
At the 2014 Secret US Classic, Johnson-Scharpf finished 31st in the all-around.

She later advanced to the 2014 P&G Championships, finishing 25th after two days of competition.

2015 
Johnson-Scharpf attended the U.S. selection camp for the 2015 City of Jesolo Trophy but was not named to the team.

Sydney competed at the Secret U.S. Classic, contributing scores of 14.400 on vault, 13.000 on bars, 14.000 on beam, and 13.750 on floor to a 7th place all-around finish of 55.150.

Sydney competed at P&G Gymnastics Championships in the junior division. She finished 6th in the all-around with a two-day combined total of 110.900, earning a spot on the 2015-2016 Junior National Team.

2016  
In her first year as a Senior International Elite gymnast, Johnson-Schaarpf competed at the City of Jesolo Trophy. She finished 18th in the All-Around competition.

In June 2016, Sydney suffered a knee injury and was not able to compete at the Secret U.S. Classic or the P&G Gymnastics Championships.

2017

Johnson-Scharpf competed at US nationals, where she placed fourth on floor.

Personal life 
Sydney was born on August 2, 2000 in Orlando, Florida to Brandy and Bill Johnson-Scharpf. Her mom, Brandy, is a former gymnast and represented the U.S. at the 1988 Olympics.

The family currently live in Groveland, Florida and Sydney graduated from Montverde Academy in 2018. Sydney is in her senior year at the University of Florida with their gymnastics team and will graduate this spring (2022) with a degree in Digital Arts and Sciences. She is now dating Hugh Brittenham (2021–present), who is a Track & Field athlete at the University of Florida.

References

External links
 

2000 births
Living people
American female artistic gymnasts
Florida Gators women's gymnasts
People from Orlando, Florida
Sportspeople from Orlando, Florida
People from Groveland, Florida
U.S. women's national team gymnasts
Montverde Academy alumni
21st-century American women